Dead Zero is a novel by Stephen Hunter, published by Simon & Schuster in 2011. It is Hunter's seventh novel whose hero is Bob Lee Swagger, a U. S. Marine Corps sniper who first appears in Point of Impact which is partially set in the Vietnam War. It is eleventh in order of publication and seventh in the chronology of the character.

Summary

Reception
Reception was mixed, with Kirkus Reviews saying, "A premise that had a chance to be compelling is diffused by a momentum-killing willingness to digress. Hunter has done much better." and The Oregonian calling it "a disappointment", while Publishers Weekly gushed that a "solid characterization complements the tight, fast-moving plot."

References

2010 American novels
American thriller novels
Books about snipers
Novels by Stephen Hunter
Sequel novels
Simon & Schuster books